Egesina mystica is a species of beetle in the family Cerambycidae. It was described by Stephan von Breuning in 1938. It is only found on the island of Borneo.

References

Egesina
Beetles described in 1938